DeUnna Hendrix is an American women's basketball coach and former basketball player. She is currently the women's basketball head coach at Miami University. She previously served as the women's  basketball head coach at High Point University.

Early life and education
Hendrix is from Kokomo, Indiana. She attended the University of Richmond where she played college basketball. She was twice named team captain and played in the 2005 NCAA tournament and 2006 WNIT Semi-Finals. While at Richmond she earned a bachelor's degree in rhetoric and communications. She played basketball professionally in the Women's Blue Chip Basketball League with the Jacksonville Cougars in 2008.

Coaching career
She began her coaching career in women's basketball at Jacksonville as an assistant under Jill Dunn from 2007 to 2011.

High Point
In 2011 she moved to High Point as an assistant for one season. In 2012 she was promoted to head coach. In seven seasons at High Point she accumulated a 125–93 record.  Her 2013–2014 won 22 games and was 16–4 in the Big South to capture the regular season title.  She was named Big South Coach of the year. She took the Panthers to the WNIT in 2014 and 2019.

Miami (OH)
She took over as the head coach at Miami on April 24, 2019.  Through the 2021–2022 season she had posted a 23–61 record at Miami.

Head coaching record

References

External links
Miami RedHawks coaching bio

Living people
1984 births
Miami RedHawks women's basketball coaches
High Point Panthers women's basketball coaches
American women's basketball coaches
Richmond Spiders women's basketball players
Sportspeople from Kokomo, Indiana
Basketball coaches from Indiana
Jacksonville Dolphins women's basketball coaches